Thalore is a suburb situated 9 km south of Thrissur city in Kerala, India. It is a part of Thrissur Municipal Corporation and Nenmanikkara Grama Panchayat.

Etymology
Since Thalore is situated at a slightly higher altitude compared to neighbouring villages it got the name Thaloor (Malayalam: തലൂര്) from the two Malayalam words തല (meaning head) and ഊര് (meaning place). Thaloor later became Thalore.

Geography
The Infant Jesus Church at a height of 96 feet above sea level, is the highest situated structure in the village. From there, the terrain slowly tapers down towards all sides; the village boundary is approximately 30 feet above sea level.

Transportation
Old NH-47 to Thrissur passes through Thalore centre. The new NH-47 by-pass to Palakkad is now the south-east boundary. Thaikkattussery road connects the old NH-47 from Thalore centre to Thaikkattusery. Both KSRTC and private bus services connect Thalore to Thrissur in the north and Amballur, Pudukkad, Kodakara and Chalakkudy in the south. The nearest railway stations are Ollur and Pudukkad stations where local passenger services stop. Express trains are available from Thrissur.

Economy
In the 1970s, the paddy fields became economically non-viable, and were soon turned into clay brick farms. Thalore and its neighbouring places became the epicenter of this clay brick business, and it remains a major source of income for villagers. Like any other village in Kerala, Thalore also has a significant non-resident kerala community which also brings resources to the village.

Educational Institutions
 Navajyothi College, Thalore
 Deepthi Higher Secondary School, Thalore
 Deepthi Higher Secondary School (Unaided), Thalore
 Deepthi High School, Thalore
 Jesus Academy CBSE School, Thalore
 St. Teresita's Upper Primary School, Thalore
 Little Flower Lower Primary School, Thalore
 Nazareth English Medium Nursery School, Thalore
 Jesus Academy Kindergarten and Daycare, Thalore

Religious Institutions
 Infant Jesus Parish Church, Thalore
 Infant Jesus Monastery Church, Thalore
 Infant Jesus Monastery, Thalore
 Chapel of St. Theresa, Thalore
 Jerusalem Retreat Centre, Thalore
 Vocationist Fathers (Fr. Justin Vocationary) S.D.V. Minor Seminary, Thalore
 Navajyothi Bhavan (CHF), Thalore
 Our Lady of Lourdes (CHF), Thalore
 Laverna Bhavan (FSSH), Thalore

Industry
There are around 10 tile and brick factories operate in Thalore.

External links

CMI Educational Institutions, Thalore
Thalore Mailing List
Thalore Orkut Community
Boundaries of Thalore in Google Map

Suburbs of Thrissur city
Cities and towns in Thrissur district